The Hattie O. and Henry Drake Octagon House, built c. 1893, is an octagonal house located at 605 3rd Street, South West, in Huron, South Dakota. The home's most unusual feature may be its mansard roof.

On January 30, 1992, it was added to the National Register of Historic Places.

References

Houses on the National Register of Historic Places in South Dakota
Buildings and structures in Huron, South Dakota
Octagon houses in the United States
Houses in Beadle County, South Dakota
National Register of Historic Places in Beadle County, South Dakota